"Wake Up" (stylized in all caps) is a song by American rapper Travis Scott featuring Canadian singer-songwriter the Weeknd. It was released on March 26, 2019, as the fourth single from Scott's third studio album, Astroworld (2018).

Background and release
The song was originally supposed to be included in the Weeknd's 2018 EP My Dear Melancholy. However, the song was later given to Scott, to be included on his third studio album Astroworld. Following the release of the aforementioned album's third single "Yosemite", "Wake Up" was sent to rhythmic contemporary radio on March 26, 2019, as Astroworlds fourth single.

Composition
Over an ambient guitar beat, "Wake Up" is in the key of B Minor at 149 BPM.

Critical reception 
"Wake Up" received positive reviews from critics, with many praising the acoustic production of the track and its fusion of the Weeknd's and Scott's vocals. Tesfaye's vocal delivery and Sevn Thomas' guitar hook were also subject to appraise.

Commercial performance 
"Wake Up" initially entered the Billboard Hot 100 at number 30 on the issue dated August 18, 2018, where it became the seventh highest charting song from the album. The track then charted at 71 for an additional week before falling off the Hot 100. Following its release as a single, "Wake Up" managed to chart an additional five weeks in the summer of 2019, where it reached a position of 82. The song also became Scott's sixth number-one on Billboards Rhythmic Songs chart and would have been the Weeknd's tenth number-one if credited on the chart.

Music video
The official music video for the song was directed by Jonah Hill, and was released on July 25, 2019. It features Scott walking through a mansion filled with sleeping people, that is gradually losing gravity in its interior and exterior. A black and white tint is also present throughout the entire video. The Weeknd and his respective bridge and chorus at the end of the song, do not appear in the video.

Charts

Weekly charts

Year-end charts

Certifications

Release history

References

External links
 

2019 singles
2018 songs
Epic Records singles
Travis Scott songs
The Weeknd songs
Songs written by Travis Scott
Songs written by the Weeknd
Songs written by Mike Dean (record producer)
Songs written by Frank Dukes
Songs written by Sevn Thomas
Cactus Jack Records singles
Compositions in B minor